Dr. Squatch is an American personal care brand that focuses on products using natural ingredients marketed specifically to men. Now based in Los Angeles, the company was founded in 2013 in San Diego. Dr. Squatch's products are marketed as made without skin irritants, ingredients that are chemically derived or environmentally damaging, and are not tested on animals.

As of 2021, the company's annual revenue is $100 million per year.

References

External links

2015 establishments in California
Personal hygiene products
Manufacturing companies based in Los Angeles
American brands
American companies established in 2015